Avesh Khan (born 13 December 1996) is an Indian international cricketer. In December 2015 he was named in India's squad for the 2016 Under-19 Cricket World Cup. He made his international debut for the Indian cricket team in February 2022.

A right-arm fast-medium bowler, he's mainly known for his pace, able to maintain speed at around 145kph while his fastest delivery has been measured at 149kph.

Domestic career
He made his Twenty20 debut for Royal Challengers Bangalore in the 2017 Indian Premier League on 14 May 2017. In January 2018, he was bought by the Delhi Daredevils in the 2018 IPL auction. He made his List A debut for Madhya Pradesh in the 2017–18 Vijay Hazare Trophy on 5 February 2018.

He was the leading wicket-taker for Madhya Pradesh in the 2018–19 Ranji Trophy, with 35 dismissals in seven matches. In October 2019, he was named in India C's squad for the 2019–20 Deodhar Trophy.

Avesh finished as Delhi Capitals' highest wicket-taker in IPL 2021 and the second highest wicket taker in the tournament with 24 wickets. In February 2022, he was bought by the Lucknow Super Giants in the auction for the 2022 Indian Premier League tournament. He was bought for ₹ 10Cr, making him the most expensive uncapped player in the history of the IPL.

International career
In January 2021, he was named as one of five net bowlers in India's Test squad for their series against England. In May 2021, he was also named as one of four standby players in India's Test squad for the final of the 2019–2021 ICC World Test Championship and their away series against England.

In November 2021, he was named in India's Twenty20 International (T20I) squad for their series against New Zealand. In January 2022, Khan was named in India's One Day International (ODI) and T20I squads for their home series against the West Indies. The following month, he was named in India's T20I squad for their series against Sri Lanka. He made his T20I debut on 20 February 2022, for India against the West Indies. Khan picked up his maiden T20I wicket in the final T20I against Sri Lanka, finishing with figures of 2/23 in his four overs.

In July 2022, he was named in India's ODI squad for their away series against the West Indies. He made his ODI debut for India on 24 July 2022, against the West Indies.

References

External links
 

1996 births
Living people
Indian cricketers
India One Day International cricketers
India Twenty20 International cricketers
Cricketers from Indore
Madhya Pradesh cricketers
Delhi Capitals cricketers
Royal Challengers Bangalore cricketers
Lucknow Super Giants cricketers